Turk of America is an English-language quarterly Turkish magazine which reports news about Turkish businesses and the Turkish community in the United States. It was founded in 2002 with its first issue published in August of the same year. "The magazine is not affiliated with any political organization, party, ethnic group, or ideology."

Turk of America is based in New York City. The magazine  is distributed in Alabama, Arkansas, California, Connecticut, Florida, Georgia, Illinois, Indiana, Maryland, Massachusetts, New Jersey, New York, Ohio, Pennsylvania, Rhode Island, Texas, Virginia, and Washington, D.C. by subscription, and has a circulation of over 10,000.

The magazine has interviewed major figures including Süleyman Demirel, Recep Tayyip Erdoğan, Kürşad Tüzmen, Güler Sabancı, Ferit Şahenk, Melih Abdulhayoglu, Arif Mardin, Sezen Aksu, Sertab Erener, Fahir Atakoğlu, and Demir Demirkan.

References

External links 
 

Middle Eastern-American culture in New York City
News magazines published in the United States
Works about Turkey
Quarterly magazines published in the United States
English-language magazines
Magazines established in 2002
Turkish-American culture in New York (state)
Magazines published in New York City